Mathias (von) Lüttichau (9 December 1795, Egebjerggård – 13 April 1870, Store Grundet) was a Danish nobleman, royal chamberlain and Minister of War. He was a member of the 1848 Danish Constituent Assembly by royal appointment. Lüttichau was one of the 10 members of the assembly who protested against the creation of the constitution in favour of an absolute monarchy.

Lüttichau was a member of the Lüttichau noble family.

References 

19th-century Danish nobility
19th-century Danish politicians
People from Nordfyn Municipality
Lüttichau family
1795 births
1870 deaths